The House of Vincke is the name of an old and influential Westphalian noble family.

History 
First recorded in 1223 in Osnabrück, their name derives from the zoonym finch (Middle High German ). They acquired estates in the present communities of Melle (Gut Ostenwalde) and Rödinghausen (Haus Kilver) in the 14th century, and in the 18th to 19th centuries further possessions in Rödinghausen and other parts of Westphalia, as well in Silesia (Kilver line).

In the 19th century, Prussia granted the habitual right to the title Freiherr (baron); the predicate von was used only by parts of the family (Freiherren Vincke vs. Freiherren von Vincke).

Notable member of the Olbendorf line (Kilver line) of the family was the Prussian politician Carl von Vincke. Ludwig von Vincke, of the Ostenwalde line (1774–1844), served as president of the Prussian Province of Westphalia. His sons were the politician Georg von Vincke, known for fighting a pistol duel with Otto von Bismarck in 1852, and Gisbert von Vincke (1813–1892), Prussian official, poet and Shakespeare-researcher.

Gut Ostenwalde with the nearby Diedrichsburg is yet a property of the Vincke family, whereas Haus Kilver had to be sold in the 1820's by economic reasons. After World War II Gut Ostenwalde was confiscated by the British Army as residence for the commanders of the British occupation zone in Germany, Field Marshall Bernard Montgomery and his successors Marshall Sholto Douglas and General Brian Robertson.

Notable members 
 Karl von Vincke (1800-1869), Prussian officer
 Georg von Vincke (1811-1875), Prussian politician 
 Ludwig von Vincke (1774-1844), Prussian statesman

Gallery

References

Genealogisches Handbuch des Adels, Adelslexikon vol. XV (vol. 134), C. A. Starke Verlag, Limburg (Lahn) 2004.

External links 
Gut Ostenwalde : History (in German)

Westphalian nobility
German noble families